Mikhail Markovich Umansky (January 21, 1952 – December 17, 2010) was a Russian chess grandmaster of correspondence chess, who was the 13th ICCF World Champion in correspondence chess between 1989 and 1998. He was also USSR Correspondence Champion in 1978.

Chess biography
Umansky was born in Stavropol, then USSR. He is considered by some to be the greatest correspondence chess player of all time, since he convincingly won a "champion of champions" tournament, the ICCF 50 Years World Champion Jubilee, a special invitational correspondence tournament involving all living former ICCF World Champions. He scored 7/8 (+6 −0 =2), two points ahead of Gert Jan Timmerman, Fritz Baumbach and Victor Palciauskas. One of his victims was Hans Berliner, who said after his defeat: "It is amazing that Umansky took only 55 days to play this wonderful game. I still do not know when I went wrong."

Umansky died on December 17, 2010 in Augsburg, Germany.

In 2011, the Russian Correspondence Chess Association organized in his honor the chess tournament Umansky Memorial, won by the Italian CCGM Eros Riccio.

References

External links

 

1952 births
2010 deaths
World Correspondence Chess Champions
Correspondence chess grandmasters
Russian chess players
Soviet chess players